The 2018 Best of Nollywood Awards was the 10th edition of the ceremony, and took place in Kakanfo conference centre in Ibadan, Oyo state on 9 December 2018. The Oyo state governor, Abiola Ajimobi  served as the chief host. The event was co-hosted by comedian, Helen Paul and actor, Keppy Ekpeyong Bassey.

A total 112 films, including 93 feature films, 9 short films and 1 documentary series were considered. The nomination list was revealed in November 2018 where We Don’t Live Here Anymore by Tope Oshin earned the highest nominations with 11 nominations, followed by Oga Bolaji with 10 nominations, Queen of Queens with 8 nominations and Obsession earning 6 nominations.

We Don’t Live Here Anymore won in four of the categories, including best director, best editing, movie of the year and the most promising actor award which was jointly awarded to Francis Sule and Temidayo Akinboro. Oga Bolaji won 1 of the awards in the 10 categories it was nominated in.

Awards

References 

2018
2018 awards
2018 in Nigerian cinema